The Garwood Load Packer was a refuse collection vehicle built by Garwood Industries in Detroit, Michigan.  Engineered by Melvin Donald Silvey, the Packer brought significant changes in the mode and automation of garbage collection in the United States.

The Garwood Load Packer was one of the first vehicles to utilize a compactor, increasing the truck's hauling capacity and reducing the costs of larger payloads. The Packer was introduced in 1938, but significant numbers weren't manufactured until after World War II. By 1949, over 2500 of these trucks were in use across the US and Canada.  Almost all waste collection vehicles today utilize some type of compaction mechanism.

External links
Garwood Load Packer

Waste collection vehicles